The Tumbling Weir is a circular weir in the town of Ottery St. Mary, Devon, England that allows water from a leat or man-made stream to reach the River Otter.

It is apparently a rare design in that the water enters through a circular opening at the top that is surrounded by the stream. The water then cascades down some more smaller rings until it enters a culvert which enters a tunnel under the nearby path before sluicing down to the river a few metres away.

History 
From medieval times the production of wool cloth was a major Devon industry. However, during the early part of the 18th century, this industry began to decline in the face of competition from cotton and cheaper Yorkshire yarns. Attempting to revive the local economy, Sir George Yonge and Sir John Duntze, Members of Parliament and joint Lords of the Manor, launched a scheme in 1788 to build a new manufactory at Ottery, for the carding and spinning of wool, using the recently invented water frame machinery. At the same time, the original corn mill, which had stood here for 700 years, was demolished, and a new, much bigger one built.

The existing leat which supplied the old corn mill did not provide a sufficient head of water for the new mill, so the level of the water in the mill basin had to be raised by 2.4 metres. This was achieved by reducing the fall along the leat. Then, as now, the water level was maintained by the circular 'tumbling weir', which discharged the overflow into the river through a short tunnel. Water was conveyed from the mill basin to the 5.5 metre water wheel inside the factory (reported to be capable of producing 30 horsepower) by an overhead aqueduct - the factory launder. A second 3.6 metre overshot wheel powered the corn mill.

The corn mill, according to a notice in the Sherborne Mercury in 1835:

has three pairs of stones, a Bolting Mill, Rubble Machine and Smut Machine, with extensive Lofts; they are driven by a very powerful stream affording a never-failing supply of water and are capable of making at least one hundred sacks a week.

In 1824 the enterprise was converted to the manufacture of silk, and up to 400 female workers were employed. In 1897 the factory was sold to Keetch & Co, brush manufacturers, the first of several subsequent owners.

The corn mill continued to operate until 1937; the factory launder was demolished in 1945.

Today 
Today the mill site and the adjoining factory is unoccupied, awaiting re-development. Near the site is the Tumbling Weir Hotel, a converted 17th century thatched house, now a popular hotel and restaurant.

References

Buildings and structures in Devon
Weirs in England
Industrial archaeological sites in Devon